KPAX may refer to:

 KPAX-TV, a U.S. television station (channel 8) licensed to Missoula, Montana
 K-PAX, a series of novels by Gene Brewer
 K-PAX (film), the film based on the first novel of that series
K-Pax Racing, an auto racing team